Generic Modeling Environment (GME) is a model-integrated program synthesis tool for creating domain-specific models of large-scale systems. GME allows users to define new modeling languages using UML-based metamodels. GME was developed by the Institute for Software Integrated Systems at Vanderbilt University. GME is a part of the META Tool Suite and the Adaptive Vehicle Make program. The main language it uses is CyPhyML. The new version of GME, called WebGME, is entirely web-browser based. It supports simultaneous distributed collaborative editing of models and has a version controlled database backend in the cloud.

See also
 Adaptive Vehicle Make (AVM)
 Domain-specific modelling (DSM)
 Executable Architecture (EA)
 MetaCASE tool
 Ptolemy Project

External links 
 GME
 WebGME

UML tools